The Old Guangde dialect is a Northern Wu dialect spoken in southeastern Anhui province in southeastern Guangde county, China. It is now losing ground to the New Guangde dialect, a Jianghuai Mandarin dialect. It is closely related to Shanghainese and the Suzhou dialect, but its closest relative is the Huzhou dialect. It is a Northern Wu dialect exclave surrounded by speakers of Jianghuai Mandarin and Xuanzhou Wu.

Phonology

Initials

Finals

Tones

Wu Chinese